ACM Transactions on Graphics (TOG) is a bimonthly peer-reviewed scientific journal that covers the field of computer graphics. 

The editor-in-chief is Carol O'Sullivan (Trinity College Dublin). According to the Journal Citation Reports, the journal had a 2020 impact factor of 5.414. The journal ranks 1st in computer graphics publications, according to Google Scholar Metrics.

History 
It was established in 1982 and is published by the Association for Computing Machinery. TOG publishes two special issues for ACM SIGGRAPH's conference proceedings. Starting in 2003, all papers accepted for presentation at the annual SIGGRAPH conference are printed in a special summer issue of the journal. Beginning in 2008, papers presented at SIGGRAPH Asia are printed in a special November/December issue.

References

External links

Computer graphics
Computer science journals
Transactions on Graphics
Bimonthly journals